Sangeeta Katti Kulkarni, is an Indian playback singer, Hindustani classical vocalist, musician, music composer from Karnataka. She was awarded the Karnataka Rajyotsava Award in 2006 by the Government of Karnataka.

Introduction

Sangeeta Katti was born in Dharwad in Karnataka. She is a daughter of Dr. H. A . Katti and Bharati Katti, on 7 October 1970.

Sangeeta Katti has a performance experience in Hindustani Vocal as well as Bhajans, Vachanas, Dasavani, Abhangs, Bhavageet, Folk Music and Playback singing.

Sangeeta Katti is a graduate in chemistry (with distinction) and well versed in several languages like Kannada, Hindi, English, Marathi etc.
Sangeeta Katti won several awards for her compositions and albums.

Sangeeta Katti has worked with the leading music directors including Upendra Kumar, M. Ranga Rao, Vijaya Bhaskar, M. M. Keervani, C. Ashwath, Hamsalekha and others and sung in nine Indian languages with M. Balamurali Krishna, K. J. Yesudas, S. P. Balasubrahmanyam, Rajkumar, P. B. Srinivas and others. Sangeeta is an 'A' grade artist in Classical and Light Music both on AIR and television.

She has toured abroad, all over UK, USA, Australia, New Zealand, Gulf and Canada and other countries performing live concerts.

Sangeeta Katti is residing in Bangalore, India with her husband and children.

Childhood

Sangeeta Katti received initial lessons from her father. At the age of four, she met Naushad Ali which she considered a turning point in her life. Naushad Ali asked her to sing some ragas and was impressed by the child prodigy and since then she became his student. Trained initially under Sri Sheshagiri Dandapur and Pt. Chanderashekhar Puranikmath, Sangeeta received advanced training in classical vocals from Padmabhushan Pt. Basavaraj Rajguru of Kirana & Gwalior Gharana for about 12 years. She is presently under the tutelage of Padmavibushana Gana Sarswati Smt Kishori Amonkar of the Jaipur-Atrauli Gharana

Others 
Sangeeta Katti to date has more than 7000 + concerts to her credit, her very first performance being at the age of four. She has also performed in the United States, UK, New Zealand and Canada. She is a regular feature in most of the important music festivals in India. She was a teaching faculty in Hindustani Vocal music at Bharathiya Vidya Bhavan, Bengaluru.

Playback singing
Sangeetha Katti has sung several songs and her songs in the film Nagamandala like Ee Hasiru Siriyali and Kambada Myalina Bombeye have been widely acclaimed. She mainly works in Kannada movies as well as a few Tamil Movies.

Discography

List of concerts

 Mysore Dasara (Darbar Hall) festival in 1983, 1987, 1999, 2005, 2008, 2014.
 51st Sawai Gandharva Sangeetotsav, Pune – December 2003.
 Hampi Utsav – 1989, 1993, 1998, 2004, 2007, 2010. (A National Cultural fest conducted by Govt of Karnataka)
 Other important state festivals like:-- Sahyadri utsav in 1998, Navsarpur utsav in 1991, Hoysala utsav in 2004, Kittur Utsav in 2004
 The Spirit of Unity Concerts for Universal Integration – 1998 (Bobbili, Vizianagaram) 2000 (Vishakhapatnam).
 Mahakumbha Mela, Haridwar, Uttaranchal April 2010.
 Several other important places like Mumbai, Goa, Delhi, Nasik, Hyderabad, Pune, Chennai, Bangalore, Mantralayam and others.

Concerts in abroad

UK:
 Vishwa Kannada Sammelana, Millennium Meet at Manchester – Aug 2000, Aug 2008 .
 Young Kannadigas at London, Rajyotsava celebrations, Nov 2008.
 UKKV Ugadi at Cardiss, April 2011.

USA:
 AKKA Conventions at Houston, Texas, – Sep 2000, Detroit Michigan – Sep 2002, Orlando Florida, Sep 2004, Baltimore, MD, Sep 2006
 Basant Bahar, California.- 2002,2004. NA Kannadigas – 2000, 2002. Kannada Kuta LA & San Diego – 2002
 Sri Venkateshwara Temple, Pittsburgh – 2002 and Purandara dasa day, June 2004.
 Kannada Sangha Atlanta – 2000. VSNA Convention, Atlanta – July 2004.
 Kannada Kuta, Hindu Temple & Other associations at Chicago – 2000, 2002, 2004, 2006, 2008
 Sai Baba Temple, Aurora, IL- 2004
 HTGC, Lemont IL – 2002
 Pampa Kannada Kuta at MI, 2002, 2004. Michigan Symphony, Detroit, MI (2010). Music Community of Greater Metropolitan Detroit, MI 2002
 Kaveri Kannada Kuta, MD – 2000, 2002, 2004 ...West Virginia & Washington DC
 Music Community of greater Metropolitan Detroit, MI – Sep 2002
 Triveni (Brindavan) Kannada Sanga at NJ and NY – 2000, 2002, 2004
 CVHTS, Connecticut – 2002, 2004
 Annual Music and Dance Festival, ICHS, Dallas, TX – 2004. Mallige Kannada Kuta, Dallas, TX – 2000.
 Kannada Association of Northern California and Los Angeles – 2000, 2002
 Kannada Association St. Louis – 2004
 Mallige Kannada Sangha at Clarion Hotel Auditorium, Indianapolis, Indiana – 2004. Gita Mandal Indianapolis, Indiana – 2004
 Swanranjali – Columbus, Ohio- 2000, 2004
 VMS Sri Jayathirtha Aradhana Day Allentown, Pennsylvania, 2004

Canada:
 Kannada Association – Toronto – 2000, 2004
 Rendered Vande Mataram at The Panorama India – Indo – Canadian Cultural Fest. Toronto – 2004

Australia:
 Successful tour (APKO) in 2009 – Sydney, Melbourne, Adelaide etc.

New Zealand:
 APKO in 2009 – Auckland. Sangeeta Sarita in 2010 – Auckland

Hong Kong:
 APKO – India Association, 2009

Bahrain:
 SAARTHA Foundation in Nov 2010

Other Associations like:
 Sunnyvale Temple, California, Birmingham – Alabama, San Diego, Evansville – IN, Louisville – KY, Hindu Temple, Detroit etc.

Awards & recognitions

Sangeeta has won numerous awards. The list follows

References

External links

Sangeeta Katti's Official Website

1970 births
Living people
Hindustani singers
Kannada playback singers
Kannada people
People from Dharwad
Indian women playback singers
Indian women classical singers
Singers from Karnataka
20th-century Indian singers
20th-century Indian women singers
Film musicians from Karnataka
21st-century Indian women singers
21st-century Indian singers
Women musicians from Karnataka
Recipients of the Rajyotsava Award 2006